Bhagirathi Majhi (1 February 1954 – 2 November 2020) was an Indian politician from Bharatiya Janata Party. He was a Member of the Parliament of India representing Orissa in the Rajya Sabha, the upper house of the Indian Parliament. 

Majhi died on 2 November 2020, at a hospital in Mayurbhanj district from COVID-19. He was born in Murumdihi, Mayurbhanj / Orissa, and was 66 at the time of his death.

References

External links
 Profile on Rajya Sabha website

1954 births
2020 deaths
Bharatiya Janata Party politicians from Odisha
Rajya Sabha members from Odisha
People from Mayurbhanj district
Deaths from the COVID-19 pandemic in India